An arsenide mineral is a mineral that contains arsenide as its main anion. Arsenides are grouped with the sulfides in both the Dana and Strunz mineral classification systems.

Examples 
 algodonite 
 domeykite 
 löllingite
 nickeline 
 rammelsbergite 
 safflorite 
 skutterudite 
 sperrylite

References